The 11th Pan Arab Games took place in Cairo, Egypt from 11 – 26 November 2007. A total of 22 countries participated in 32 events. These games were the largest in the games' history; seven new events were introduced and 2000 more athletes participated than in previous years, making them 8000 Arab athletes. It was also the first time that some of the Arab football federations participated with their first teams.

Games

Opening ceremony
The opening ceremony started with the Egyptian Singer Tamer Hosny singing a new song for Arab unity, and then the entrance of several Arab Leaders with Hosni Mubarak, including the Sudanese President Omar Hassan al-Bashir, Palestinian President Mahmoud Abbas, Yemeni President Ali Abdullah Saleh, Iraqi President Jalal Talabani, and the Saudi Crown Prince Sultan bin Abdul Aziz. This was followed by the entrance of the 22 participating teams. The opening word was given to several Arab Sport Federation Chiefs, and the Secretary general of the Arab League, Amr Moussa, and ended with Egyptian President Mubarak's opening words.

The ceremony was divided into eight parts; it started with the Narration of the Abraham's Trip in the desert, and the founding of the Ka'aba, thus Mecca, and Arab Unity under Islam, and stressed on the power of Words in the Quran, and then it showed several dances showing the Arab Literature and Arts, then showed performances explaining the Arab's leadership in philosophy, mathematics, astronomy, medicine, gardening and music. Throughout the performance, several Arab scientists, poets, philosophers, mathematicians and travellers were mentioned as well as several verses of the Quran, and how it helped Arabs to achieve such glorious achievements. The Ceremony was wrapped up with the Egyptian National Anthem then an Arab Song called "Amgad Ya Arab" (Glories o Arabs).

Sports

Disability sports
 Athletics
 Table tennis
 Volleyball
 Weightlifting

Medal table

Participation

By Alphabetical Order

Mascot
The official mascot of Games is Bastet, whose name was derived from the ancient Egyptian goddess Bast. The mascot Bastet is a black cat, with a headscarf in the ancient Egyptian style, striped with Egypt's flag.

References

External links
 Official website 

 
2007
2007 in multi-sport events
Pan Arab Games
Pan Arab Games
Pan Arab Games, 2007
Pan Arab Games, 2007
Multi-sport events in Egypt
2000s in Cairo
November 2007 sports events in Africa